Nauru competed at the 2019 Pacific Games in Apia, Samoa from 7 to 20 July 2019. The country participated in eight sports at the 2019 games.

Athletics

Basketball

Nauru selected four players in each of their men's and women's 3x3 basketball teams to compete at the 2019 games.

Men's 3x3
 Morrison Depaune
 Gaverick Mwareow
 Fallon Natano
 Rotui Star

Women's 3x3
 Febony Detenamo
 Micheala Detenamo
 Janet Hubert
 Hanna Olsson

Boxing

Nauru selected three male boxers to compete in boxing at the 2019 games.

Men
 Christon Amram
 Colan Caleb
 Yachen Cook

Judo

Rugby sevens

Men's sevens

Women's sevens

Tennis

Volleyball

Beach volleyball

Nauru selected a men's pair to compete in beach volleyball at the 2019 games.

Men
 Zumi Doguape
 Eodogi Dekarube

Weightlifting

References

Nations at the 2019 Pacific Games
2019
Pacific Games